A lexifier is the language that provides the basis for the majority of a pidgin or creole language's vocabulary (lexicon). Often this language is also the dominant, or superstrate language, though this is not always the case, as can be seen in the historical Mediterranean Lingua Franca. In mixed languages, there are no superstrates or substrates, but instead two or more adstrates. One adstrate still contributes the majority of the lexicon in most cases, and would be considered the lexifier. However, it is not the dominant language, as there are none in the development of mixed languages, such as in Michif.

Structure 
Pidgin and creole language names are often written as the following: Location spoken + Stage of Development + Lexifier language. For example: Malaysian Creole Portuguese, with Portuguese being the lexifier and the superstrate language at the time of the creole development.

Often the autoglossonym, or the name the speakers give their contact language, is written Broken + Lexifier, e.g. Broken English. This becomes confusing when multiple contact languages have the same lexifier, as different languages could be called the same name by their speakers. Hence, the names are as stated above in the literature to reduce this confusion.

Name 
The word lexifier is derived from the modern Latin word lexicon, meaning a catalogue of the vocabulary or units in a given language.

Examples
English is the lexifier of English-based creole languages, such as:
Jamaican Patois
 Belizean Creole
 Miskito Coast Creole
San Andres Creole English
Singapore Colloquial English, a.k.a. "Singlish"
French is the lexifier of French-based creole languages, such as:
 Antillean Creole
 French Guianese Creole
Haitian Creole
 Louisiana Creole
 Mauritian Creole
 Réunion Creole
 Portuguese is the lexifier of Portuguese-based creole languages, such as:
Cape Verdean Creole
 Korlai Creole Portuguese
Malaysian Creole Portuguese
Papiamento
Guinea-Bissau Creole
 Spanish is the lexifier of Spanish-based creole languages, such as:
 Chavacano
 Palenquero
 Dutch is the lexifier of Dutch-based creole languages, such as:
Negerhollands
 Berbice Dutch Creole
 Zulu is the lexifier of Zulu-based creole languages, such as:
Fanagalo

References

Pidgins and creoles